Hemirhabdus is a genus of copepods belonging to the family Heterorhabdidae.

The species of this genus are found in all world oceans.

Species:

Hemirhabdus amplus 
Hemirhabdus grimaldii

References

Copepods